The Nation's Cup Score Men in the 2019–20 Biathlon World Cup is led by Norway, who is the defending titlist. Each nation's score comprises the points earned by its three best placed athletes in every Sprint and Individual competition, the points earned in the Men's Relay competitions, and half of the points earned in the Mixed Relay competitions.

For this season only the best 19 results out of 25 will be counted towards the standings.

2019–20 Top 3 standings

Standings

References

External links 

 Men's Nation Cup Score

Nations Men